The Royal Hospital for Sick Children may refer to:
Bristol Royal Hospital for Children
Royal Hospital for Sick Children, Edinburgh
Royal Hospital for Children, Glasgow

See also
List of children's hospitals